Shin Chang-jae (born 1953/54) is a Korean businessman, the chairman and CEO of Kyobo Life Insurance Company.

Early life
He is the son of Shin Yong-ho, who founded Kyobo Life Insurance Company in 1958. Shin received a doctorate from Seoul National University.

Career

He trained as an obstetrician and worked as a professor at the Seoul National University medical school. He has been chairman and CEO of Kyobo Life Insurance Company since 2000. In June 2015, Forbes estimated his net worth at US$2.3 billion.

Personal life
He is married with two sons and lives in Seoul, South Korea.

References

1950s births
Living people
South Korean billionaires